To Write Love on Her Arms (also known as Day One; formerly Renee) is a 2012 American biographical drama film written and directed by Nathan Frankowski and starring Kat Dennings, Chad Michael Murray, Rupert Friend, Mark Saul, Juliana Harkavy, and Corbin Bleu. The film is based on the life of troubled teenager Renee Yohe and the founding of To Write Love on Her Arms by Jamie Tworkowski, after he and others helped Yohe to overcome her challenges enough to be able to enter rehab. The film premiered at the Omaha Film Festival on March 11, 2012, and was eventually released on DVD on March 3, 2015.

Plot
It is 2006, and 19-year-old Renee Yohe has always loved fairy tales: the idea of a princess, a hero and a happily ever after. However, her life is that of a darker tale. As she battles with drug addiction, bipolar disorder, self-harm and other life issues, she receives love and support from numerous friends and new acquaintances, including Jamie Tworkowski and David McKenna. When Yohe is turned away from drug rehabilitation, with open wounds from self-cutting making her too great a treatment risk, McKenna takes her into his home for five days of detox, while Tworkowski posts an article on Myspace, titled "To Write Love on Her Arms" (in contrast to Yohe having written "Fuck Up" on her arm, with a razor blade), to fundraise the cost of rehab. Their efforts for Yohe are successful, and leads to Tworkowski founding the charity group To Write Love on Her Arms, offering similar support to other people who have depression, suicidal thoughts, addictions, or struggles with self-harm.

Cast

Production

Pre-production
Josh Lujan Loveless, Bob Massey, Jamie Tworkowski, and Renee Yohe all served as story consultants for the film, collaborating with Frankowski for the script. The film is produced by David Blair McKenna, a long time friend of Yohe's who provided her his home as a place to get sober, as depicted in the film, so she could enter rehab.

Filming
Principal photography started on February 23, 2011, exactly five years after Yohe and Tworkowski first met. Filming went until March 29, 2011, and was shot entirely in Yohe's home town of Orlando, Florida. Various scenes were shot at Valencia Community College, The DAVE School, Full Sail University and Wall Street Plaza.

Soundtrack
The film features songs from Travis McCoy, Paper Route, Rachael Yamagata, Dead Man's Bones, Corbin Bleu, Between the Trees, Kye Kye, Flint Eastwood, Flagship, Gatlin Elms, Duologue, Danny Leggett, Civilian, Savannah, Alex Bennett, and Bearcat.

Release
The film opened the 21st Florida Film Festival on April 13, 2012, playing at the Regal Winter Park Village. The film was released directly to DVD three years later, on March 3, 2015.

Piracy
On November 27, 2014, the film was leaked onto several peer-to-peer file sharing websites four months ahead of its intended public release. The film was one of five Sony Pictures films leaked, though fewer than 20,000 people downloaded To Write Love on Her Arms, compared to the 1.6 million combined downloads of Fury, Annie, Still Alice, and Mr. Turner.

Awards and accolades

References

External links
 
 
 
 

2012 films
2012 biographical drama films
2012 independent films
2010s English-language films
American biographical drama films
American independent films
Films about addiction
Films about depression
Films about self-harm
Films about suicide
Films scored by Andy Hunter (DJ)
Films set in 2006
Films set in Florida
Films shot in Florida
2010s American films